Shining  is the second studio album by Australian singer Marcia Hines. Hines had been resident in Australia since 1970. Shining peaked at No. 3, and remains Hines' highest charting studio album. It sold more than 150,000 copies.

Track listing

Personnel
Produced and arranged by Robie Porter
Assistant producer – J. M. Wagner
Arranged by Colin Loughnan (tracks: A3 to A6, B3 to B5), Graeme Lyall (tracks: A2, B1, B2) & Jimmie Haskell (tracks: A1)
Recording Engineer - Jim Hilton
Cover Art – Barry Falkner, Brian Crowther
Cover Photography – Patrick Jobes
Recording Engineer - Jim Hilton

Charts

Weekly charts

Year-end charts

Certifications

See also
 List of Top 25 albums for 1977 in Australia

References

1976 albums
Marcia Hines albums
Albums arranged by Jimmie Haskell